Nordstromia duplicata is a moth in the family Drepanidae. It was described by Warren in 1922. It is found in north-eastern India, China (Zhejiang), Borneo and Sumatra. It has also been recorded from Japan.

References

Moths described in 1922
Drepaninae